The Dollar Bottom is a 1981 British short film directed by Roger Christian. It won an Oscar at the 53rd Academy Awards in 1981 for Best Short Subject.

Plot
Schoolboys at a public school set up an insurance scheme against being caned by the teachers. The scheme proves so successful that they float the company on the stock market.

Cast
 Robert Urquhart as Headmaster
 Rikki Fulton as Karl
 Jonathan McNeil as Taylor 2
 Angus Reid as Graham
 Iain Andrew as Browne
 David Bullion as Macadam
 Martin Thom as Macbeth
 Neil Crossan as Knox
 John Field as Hepburn
 Peter Adair as Moncrieff
 David Mowat as Porter
 Ruth Munroe as Mrs. Maclaren
 Alexander Bell as Schoolboy
 Robin Gow as Schoolboy
 Bruce Barrons as Schoolboy
 Gareth Williams as Schoolboy

References

External links

1981 films
1981 short films
British independent films
British short films
1981 independent films
Films directed by Roger Christian
Films scored by Trevor Jones
Live Action Short Film Academy Award winners
1980s English-language films
1980s British films